Matthew Forbes Pottinger (born 1973) is an American former journalist and U.S. Marine Corps officer who served as the United States deputy national security advisor from September 22, 2019, until January 7, 2021. Previously the Asia director on the National Security Council since 2017, his tenure was unusual among senior aides serving under President Trump for its length, given an administration marked by high turnover. Pottinger worked to develop the Trump administration's policies towards China. 

Pottinger submitted his resignation on the afternoon of January 6, in response to the 2021 United States Capitol attack. He left the White House the following morning.

Early life and education
Pottinger is the son of author and former Department of Justice official J. Stanley Pottinger. He was educated at Milton Academy and was a schoolmate and childhood friend of John Avlon. Pottinger graduated from the University of Massachusetts Amherst with a Bachelor of Arts degree in Chinese studies and is fluent in Mandarin.

Career

Journalism 
Before he joined the United States Marine Corps, Pottinger worked as a journalist for Reuters between 1998 and 2001. Then he moved to The Wall Street Journal until his retirement from journalism in 2005. For four years, he was a regular guest on the John Batchelor Show radio program. His stories won awards from the Society of Publishers in Asia. He covered a variety of topics, including the SARS epidemic and the 2004 Indian Ocean earthquake and tsunami; in the latter assignment, he met United States Marines and was inspired by their courage. He spent seven years reporting in China.

Military career
Pottinger's career switch was motivated by his experience in China and the Iraq War. By 2004, Pottinger had "sort of a sense of unease that China was not really going to converge with the more liberal order." He believed that when it was powerful enough, China would "influence the world on its own terms, on the terms of the ruling party." As he watched all the first phase of Iraq War unfold from a distant location in China, he was a bit troubled that "as a nation, the administration, the Congress and to a great extent the press as well had misjudged the nature of conflict." China's rise and the Iraq War had made him realize that democracy is "not inevitable and it shouldn't be taken for granted but it is a form of government very much worth fighting for."

In September 2005, Pottinger joined the Marine Corps and served as a military intelligence officer. He was over-aged and out of shape when he joined. To meet the physical qualifications, he worked out with a Marine officer who was living in Beijing. He served three deployments: one (together with Mike Gallagher) in Iraq from April to November 2007, and two in Afghanistan from November 2008 to May 2009 and July 2009 to May 2010. On his second tour in Afghanistan, he met U.S. Army General Michael T. Flynn, with whom he co-wrote a report. The report, published in January 2010 through the Center for a New American Security, was titled Fixing Intel: A Blueprint for Making Intelligence Relevant in Afghanistan. After he left active service, Pottinger worked in New York City, including for the hedge fund Davidson Kempner Capital Management.

Politics
A 2018 Politico profile described Pottinger as "a fairly typical conservative internationalist" who "has never been a Trump-style #MAGA conservative" and who donated to both Democrats and Republicans. In 2017, he was hired as a member of the U.S. National Security Council of the administration of Donald Trump. Michael Flynn, whom Pottinger had worked for in the military, made him the NSC's Asia director, and he remained in his position under H. R. McMaster and John Bolton.

In 2018, after a proposed summit with North Korea had been cancelled, The New York Times reported that "a senior White House official told reporters that even if the meeting were reinstated, holding it on June 12 would be impossible, given the lack of time and the amount of planning needed." The President subsequently alleged that the New York Times had made up the existence of the unnamed White House official; on Twitter, journalist Yashar Ali later posted audio of Pottinger giving the officially organized background briefing cited by the Times, in which, without actually using the word "impossible", he responded to a reporter's question about the feasibility of the originally scheduled date by saying "We've lost quite a bit of time that we would need" and "June 12th is in ten minutes."

In his NSC position, Pottinger advocated a tough stance on China that combined trade policy with national security. In September 2019, newly installed National Security Advisor Robert C. O'Brien named Pottinger Deputy National Security Advisor.

Because of his contacts in China, he was an early voice in the Trump administration pushing for more COVID-19 precautions and called for travel ban with China. On January 28, Pottinger met with President Trump and told him that some people in China were testing positive for COVID-19 with no symptoms, which was later confirmed by a NEJM article.

In May 2020, he gave a speech in Mandarin regarding the COVID-19 pandemic. During a virtual conversation hosted by the Ronald Reagan Presidential Foundation on September 30, 2020, Pottinger was asked about the national security implication of Chinese students in the United States. In response, he said "the great majority are people that we're glad to have here and many will stay here and start great businesses." He said it is that one percent of Chinese students that are under contract and have an obligation to bring back everything they know to serve the state back in China.

He was sanctioned by China, in January 2021, alongside 28 other Trump administration officials for alleged violations of China’s sovereignty. President Biden's National Security Council called the sanctions "unproductive and cynical."

Pottinger submitted his resignation on January 6, 2021, following the U.S. Capitol attack in which supporters of President Donald Trump invaded the U.S. Capitol building to halt the certification of President-elect Joe Biden's lawful electoral college victory.

Pottinger joined the Hoover Institution as a distinguished fellow and is a participant on its "China's Global Sharp Power Project" research team. He serves as  chairman of the Foundation for Defense of Democracies' China Program.

Personal life
In 2014, Pottinger married Dr. Yen Duong, a virologist who immigrated to the United States as a child after she and her family fled Vietnam following the Vietnam War. They have two children and live in Utah.

Further reading

References

External links
 

21st-century American businesspeople
21st-century American politicians
United States Marine Corps personnel of the Iraq War
United States Marine Corps personnel of the War in Afghanistan (2001–2021)
Journalists from New York (state)
Living people
Milton Academy alumni
New York (state) Republicans
Politicians from New York City
United States Marine Corps officers
United States Marine Corps reservists
University of Massachusetts Amherst alumni
Trump administration personnel
United States Deputy National Security Advisors
1973 births
Date of birth missing (living people)